Paracobitis iranica, the Western crested loach is a species of stone loach endemic to Euphrates and Tigris river systems.

References

Freyhof, J., H.R. Esmaeili, G. Sayyadzadeh and M. Geiger, 2014. Review of the crested loaches of the genus Paracobitis from the Iran and Iraq with the description of four new species (Teleostei: Nemacheilidae). Ichthyol. Explor. Freshwat. 25(1):11-38. 

iranica
Fish of Asia
Taxa named by Teodor T. Nalbant
Taxa named by Pier Giorgio Bianco
Fish described in 1998